George Frederick Bingley Morris  (1884–1965) was an Anglican Bishop of North Africa in the mid 20th century.

Morris was born in Edinburgh and educated at Queens' College, Cambridge and ordained in 1911. After a curacy at St Paul Portman Square he became a missionary in Uganda. Moving to Morocco he became Archdeacon of North Africa in 1936. Returning to England he was Rector of Illogan until his elevation to the episcopate in 1943.

In 1954, he resigned as Bishop of North Africa and become the first bishop of Church of England in South Africa in 1955: CESA was not part of the Church of England, despite its name. Geoffery Fisher, the then Archbishop of Canterbury, described this action as putting himself "outside the fellowship of the Anglican Communion". In 1959, he consecrated Stephen Bradley as an assistant bishop to eventually act as his successor: it is highly unusual for a single bishop to undertake a consecration alone.

References

1884 births
1965 deaths
Clergy from Edinburgh
Alumni of Queens' College, Cambridge
20th-century Church of England bishops
Anglican bishops of North Africa
Reformed Evangelical Anglican Church of South Africa bishops